Renato Sandoval Franco (born 27 June 1964) is a Mexican politician affiliated with the National Action Party. As of 2014 he served as Deputy of the LIX Legislature of the Mexican Congress representing Baja California.

References

1964 births
Living people
Politicians from Baja California
National Action Party (Mexico) politicians
Deputies of the LIX Legislature of Mexico
Members of the Chamber of Deputies (Mexico) for Baja California